A list of films produced by the Israeli film industry in 1956.

1956 releases

See also
1956 in Israel

References

External links
 Israeli films of 1956 at the Internet Movie Database

Israeli
Film
1956